Team Qhubeka was a UCI WorldTeam based in South Africa. The team rode to raise awareness and funds for Qhubeka, a South African not-for-profit organisation. The team was founded in 2007 and was the first-ever African team to ride the Tour de France (2015).

History

Foundation 
The team was founded in 2007, becoming a Continental Team in 2008. The team remained as a UCI Continental Team until the end of the 2012 season, with the team registering its interest for a Professional Continental licence for 2013 under the name MTN-Qhubeka. In November 2012, the team were registered as a Professional Continental team – Africa's first – by the Union Cycliste Internationale, for the 2013 season.

The team achieved their first major win in 2013 when Gerald Ciolek won Milan-San Remo, one of the 5 Monuments of cycling. The team received their first Grand Tour wildcard for the 2014 Vuelta a España.

In July 2014, the team announced that for the 2015 season they would be using Cervélo bikes with Brian Smith being appointed interim general manager. In August 2014, the team confirmed the signing of Edvald Boasson Hagen on a 2-year contract. In September 2014 the team announced they had signed Tyler Farrar and Matthew Goss for the 2015 season.

First African Team in Tour de France 
On 14 January 2015, the Amaury Sport Organisation (ASO) announced the 22 teams that would participate in the 2015 Tour de France, with MTN-Qhubeka making history as the first African registered team to take part. Steve Cummings brought the team their first stage win of the Tour, stage 14 on Mandela Day. The team's second Grand Tour stage victory came the following month at the 2015 Vuelta a España, where Kristian Sbaragli won a reduced bunch sprint on stage 10.

Daniel Teklehaimanot made history in the 2015 Tour de France when he spent four days in the race’s polka-dot jersey, becoming not only the first Eritrean but the first African to wear that jersey. The success brought him to the attention of the wider cycling world.

Dimension Data as new sponsor 
In July 2015, MTN announced they would end their sponsorship of the team. Two months later, Dimension Data was announced as the team's new primary sponsor. The new team name would be "Team Dimension Data for Qhubeka"; the change in name was intended to demonstrate that the team supported the Qhubeka bicycle charity rather than receiving sponsorship for them. The change came at the same time as rumours were circulating that Mark Cavendish and his lead-out man Mark Renshaw were about to sign with the team for the 2016 season. Days later the team announced Deloitte had agreed to become a major sponsor of the team; the very next day the signing of Cavendish and Renshaw – along with their former teammate Bernhard Eisel – was confirmed. Later that month Roger Hammond announced that he would join the team as a sports director for 2016, combining the role with his current position as manager of the  squad, and it was confirmed that the team had been granted a UCI World Tour licence for the 2016 season, becoming the first African team to enter cycling's top division.

Rebranding 

In 2020 the team was rebranded as "Team NTT", named for the holding company of Dimension Data. On 11 November 2020, it was announced that Riis would leave NTT Pro Cycling. The team faced an uncertain future beyond 2020, as their main sponsor NTT confirmed to be leaving the team by the end of the year. On 20 November 2020, Douglas Ryder announced that, from 2021, the team will move forward as "Qhubeka ASSOS". The team was further rebranded ahead of the 2021 Tour de France, after a five-year naming rights agreement was signed with the NextHash Group, becoming Team Qhubeka NextHash.

However, despite finding a sponsor mid-season again, the team faced financial problems. In December 2021, the UCI announced that the team would not receive a UCI WorldTour license for 2022. The team then announced they would continue at the UCI Continental level with the development team and hoped to return to the WorldTour in the future.

Team roster

Major wins

National champions

2010
 South Africa Road Race Christoff Van Heerden
 South Africa Time Trial Kevin Evans
 Rwanda Road Race Adrien Niyonshuti
2011
 South Africa Time Trial, Daryl Impey
 Namibia Road Race, Lotto Petrus
 Namibia Time Trial, Lotto Petrus
 Rwanda Road Race, Adrien Niyonshuti
2012
  South Africa Time Trial, Reinardt Janse van Rensburg
 Rwanda Road Race Adrien Niyonshuti
 Namibia Road Race, Lotto Petrus
 Namibia Time Trial, Lotto Petrus
2013
 South Africa Road Race, Jay Thomson
 Lithuania Time Trial, Ignatas Konovalovas
 South Africa U23 Road Race, Louis Meintjes
 South Africa U23 Time Trial, Louis Meintjes
2014
 South Africa Road Race, Louis Meintjes
 South Africa U23 Road Race, Louis Meintjes
 South Africa U23 Time Trial, Louis Meintjes
 Ethiopia Road Race, Tsgabu Grmay
 Ethiopia Time Trial, Tsgabu Grmay
2015
 South Africa Road Race, Jacques Janse van Rensburg
 Norway Time Trial, Edvald Boasson Hagen
 Eritrea Time Trial, Daniel Teklehaimanot
 Eritrea Road Race, Natnael Berhane
 Norway Road Race, Edvald Boasson Hagen
 Netherlands Track (Kilo), Theo Bos
 Netherlands Track (Individual sprint), Theo Bos
2016
 South Africa Road Race, Jaco Venter
 World Track (Madison), Mark Cavendish
 Belarus Time Trial, Kanstantsin Siutsou
 Norway Time Trial, Edvald Boasson Hagen
 Eritrea Time Trial, Daniel Teklehaimanot
 Rwanda Time Trial, Adrien Niyonshuti
 Eritrea Road Race, Daniel Teklehaimanot
 Belarus Road Race, Kanstantsin Siutsou
 Norway Road Race, Edvald Boasson Hagen
2017
 South Africa Road Race, Reinardt Janse van Rensburg
 Norway Time Trial, Edvald Boasson Hagen
 British Time Trial, Steve Cummings
 Eritrea Time Trial, Mekseb Debesay
 Rwanda Time Trial, Adrien Niyonshuti
 British Road Race, Steve Cummings
 Algeria Road Race, Youcef Reguigui
2018
 Norway Time Trial, Edvald Boasson Hagen
 Eritrea Road Race, Merhawi Kudus
2019 
 Eritrea Time Trial, Amanuel Gebrezgabihier
 Africa Continental Time Trial, Ryan Gibbons
2020
 South Africa Road Race, Ryan Gibbons
 Italian Road Race, Giacomo Nizzolo
 European Road Race, Giacomo Nizzolo

References

External links
 Official site

 
UCI WorldTeams
Cycling teams based in South Africa
Cycling teams established in 2007
Cycling teams disestablished in 2021
Former UCI WorldTeams
2007 establishments in South Africa
2021 disestablishments in South Africa